The men's 10,000 metres event at the 2000 Asian Athletics Championships was held in Jakarta, Indonesia on 28 August.

Results

References

2000 Asian Athletics Championships
10,000 metres at the Asian Athletics Championships